Cottunculus tubulosus is a species of fish in the family Psychrolutidae (blobfishes) found in the Northeast Atlantic Ocean.

It was described in 2007 by Ingvar Byrkjedal and Alexei Markovich Orlov.

References

tubulosus
Taxa named by Ingvar Byrkjedal
Fish described in 2007

Fish of the North Atlantic